Cameroon was represented at the 2006 Commonwealth Games in Melbourne by a xx-member strong contingent comprising xx sportspersons and xx officials.

Medals

Silver
 Brice Vivien Batchaya, Weightlifting, Men's 85 kg

Bronze 
 Delphine Atangana, Athletics, Women's 100m
 Simplice Ribouem, Weightlifting, Men's 85 kg

Nations at the 2006 Commonwealth Games
Cameroon at the Commonwealth Games
Common